Thomas Corker (1669-1670 - 10 September 1700, Falmouth, Cornwall) was known as an English agent for the Royal African Company on York Island (now Sherbro, Sierra Leone). He married a Sherbro woman and had two sons with her before his early death.

The sons also became merchant traders and developed a family dynasty that became prominent among the Sherbro people and British colonists, in the area now known as the Moyamba District, Southern Province, Sierra Leone. As paramount chiefs, they dominated the Bumpe and Kagboro chiefdoms into the 20th century. Descendants live primarily in Bonthe and Shenge of that District.

Early life and education
Born at Falmouth, Cornwall, Thomas Corker was the younger of two sons of Thomas Corker, a ship's doctor from County Meath, Ireland. His father had settled in Ireland from Manchester, England. Corker married Jane Newman, a local woman of Falmouth. Thomas was baptized on 4 February 1669. His older brother was Robert Corker. They had two younger sisters, Jane and Anne.

After their father died young, their maternal uncle John Newman Jr. acted as guardian. The boys were expected to earn their own way.

Career
At the age of 14, Thomas entered the Royal African Company as an apprentice. He was assigned to the Guinea Coast, where he served traders on the rivers. He eventually became a chief agent on York Island, Sherbro. This was a slave trading center on the Sherbro River.

While working in the Sherbro region, he married a daughter of a Sherbro chief. By Sherbro family accounts, she was known to the English as Seniora Doll or Senora Doll, and was of the house of Ya Kumba. Her father ruled on the shore of the Yawry Bay (according to Bulom oral tradition). The couple had two sons, Robin and Stephen.

Thomas Corker was transferred by the Royal African Company to The Gambia in April 1699 and left his Sherbro family behind. On a business trip to England, he died at his birthplace of Falmouth in 1700 and was buried there.

His sons, Robin and Stephen Corker, inherited their mother's chiefdom; they used their English ancestry to build influence with other early traders in the region. The Crown opened up the slave trade beyond the RAC, and the family became influential in and wealthy from it well into the nineteenth century.

The family may have intermarried in the eighteenth century and later with descendants of Skinner Caulker, an English man known to have settled in the region in the mid-eighteenth century, as did James Cleveland. Both also married local women and had descendants who competed for power in the region.

By the nineteenth century, the family was known as the Caulkers. They dominated the Bumpe Chiefdom in the colony of Sierra Leone and were a major slave trading Afro-European clan in West Africa.

Descendants
Today most of the Caulker descendants live in the towns of Bonthe and Shenge in the Moyamba District, where the Sherbro are concentrated. The clan still maintains its oral and written testimony about its English ancestor, Thomas Corker.

Honors
Corker was memorialized by a Baroque marble and freestone monument at the Church of King Charles the Martyr, Falmouth, where he had been baptized as a child. His brother Robert Corker had made his life in the town and was five times elected as mayor.

See also
Sherbro people
Seniora Doll

Notes

Resources
Adam Jones, History in Africa, Vol. 10, 1983 (1983), pp. 151–162.

http://manovision.com/ISSUES/ISSUE29/page26_28.pdf

Further reading

1700 deaths
People from Falmouth, Cornwall
Thomas
1670 births